Arthur Robert Mills, 3rd Baron Hillingdon (13 October 1891 – 5 December 1952), styled The Honourable Arthur Mills between 1898 and 1919, was a British Conservative politician.

Mills was the second son of Charles Mills, 2nd Baron Hillingdon, and the Honourable Alice Marion Harbord, daughter of Charles Harbord, 5th Baron Suffield. He succeeded his elder brother Charles Thomas Mills as Member of Parliament for Uxbridge in 1915, a seat he held until 1918. In 1919 he entered the House of Lords on the death of his father.

Lord Hillingdon married the Honourable Edith Mary Winifred Cadogan, daughter of Henry Cadogan, Viscount Chelsea, in 1916. They had two sons and three daughters. Lady Hillingdon was chairman of the Central Women's Advisory Committee of the Conservative Party and was made a Dame Commander of the Order of the British Empire in 1939. She was godmother to her niece Sarah, eldest daughter of John Spencer-Churchill, 10th Duke of Marlborough.

Lord Hillingdon died in December 1952, aged 61, and was succeeded in the barony by his eldest son, Charles. Lady Hillingdon died in June 1969, aged 73.

Arms

References

Book cited

External links

1891 births
1952 deaths
Barons in the Peerage of the United Kingdom
Conservative Party (UK) MPs for English constituencies
Politicians from London
UK MPs 1910–1918
Hillingdon, B3